Dębówka  is a village in the administrative district of Gmina Jastków, within Lublin County, Lublin Voivodeship, in eastern Poland.

A new lantern of the dead constructed in the Romanesque style was completed in 2021 in Dębowka. 
A custom of Roman Catholicism which has fallen out of fashion, the new lantern is the first such construction to be built in Europe in centuries.

References

Villages in Lublin County